Anna Viktorovna Ukolova (born February 15, 1978) is a Russian theater and film actress.

Biography 
Anna Ukolova was born in the village of Sborno-Simonovsky (now Sbornyy), Syzransky District, Samara Oblast, Russian SFSR, Soviet Union (now Russia).

After graduating from high school, Ukolova completed a course at the Samara Institute of Culture and Arts. She then attended the Russian Academy of Theatre Arts - GITIS. In 2001 Anna graduated with honors from the academy and was accepted into the troupe of the Moon Theatre of Sergei Prokhanov.

Selected filmography
2002 —  All That You Love as Lenochka, basketball player
 2002 —  The Law as Lyuba Orlova
 2002 —   Kamenskaya 2 as Anna Lazareva
 2004 —   Sarkanā Kapela as Marta
 2004 —  Daddy as Arisha
 2006 —  Nine Lives of Nestor Makhno as Maria Nikiforova
 2006 —  Alive as Syomina
 2006 —  Piranha as Nina
 2006 —   The Spot  as Anya
 2009 —  Scatty as Ksenia
 2009 —  The Miracle as Galya
 2010 —  The Edge as Matilda
 2012 —  Living as Artyom's mother
 2013 —  The Geographer Drank His Globe Away as Vetka
 2014 —  Leviathan as Anzhela
 2017 —  The Ivanovs vs. The Ivanovs as Lidia
 2017 —  Light Up! as Vera
 2020 —  Streltsov as episode
 2020 — White Snow as Yelena Vyalbe's mother

Personal life 
Husband —  Sergey Pugachev, businessman 
Son — Makar (born 19 May 2011)

Awards and nominations
 2006: Chicago International Film Festival —  Silver Hugo Award for Best Actress (The Spot; with Darya Moroz and Viktoriya Isakova)  
 2015: Nika Award  —  nomination  for Best Supporting Actress (Leviathan)

References

External links 
 
 RusActors
  Сильная женщина Анна Уколова

Living people
1978 births
People from Syzransky District
Russian film actresses
Russian television actresses
Russian stage actresses
21st-century Russian actresses